The following events related to sociology occurred in the 1810s.

1813
Events
Henri de Saint-Simon's Physiologie sociale is published.

1816
Events
Philosopher G. W. F. Hegel's Science of Logic is published.

Births
Maurice Block (February 18, 1816 – January, 9 1901)
John Woolley (February 28, 1816 – January 11, 1866)
Charlotte Brontë (April 21, 1816 – March 31, 1855)
Philip James Bailey (April 22, 1816 – September 6, 1902)
Grace Aguilar (June 1816 – September 16, 1847)
Sir John Brown (December 6, 1816 – December 27, 1896)

Deaths
Samuel Hood (December 12, 1724 – January 27, 1816)
Richard Brinsley Sheridan (October 30, 1751 – July 7, 1816)
Gavriil Derzhavin (July 14, 1743 – July 20, 1816)

1817
Events
David Ricardo's Principles of Political Economy and Taxation is published.
Henri de Saint-Simon's L'Industrie is started.

1818
Events
Louis-Gabriel de Bonald's Recherches philosophiques sur les premiers objets des connaissances morales is published.
Births
Karl Marx (May 5, 1818 – March 14, 1883)

1819
Events
Henri de Saint-Simon's L'Organisateur is published. (writing aided by Auguste Comte and Augustin Thierry)

Sociology
Sociology timelines